"Sumer is icumen in" is the incipit of a medieval English round or rota of the mid-13th century; it is also known variously as the Summer Canon and the Cuckoo Song.

The line translates approximately to "Summer has come in" or "Summer has arrived". The song is written in the Wessex dialect of Middle English. Although the composer's identity is unknown today, it may have been W. de Wycombe. The manuscript in which it is preserved was copied between 1261 and 1264.

This rota is the oldest known musical composition featuring six-part polyphony.

It is sometimes called the Reading Rota because the earliest known copy of the composition, a manuscript written in mensural notation, was found at Reading Abbey; it was probably not drafted there, however. The British Library now retains this manuscript. A copy of the manuscript in stone relief is displayed on the wall of the ruined chapter house of Reading Abbey.

Rota
A rota is a type of round, which in turn is a kind of part song. To perform the round, one singer begins the song, and a second starts singing the beginning again just as the first got to the point marked with the red cross in the first figure below. The length between the start and the cross corresponds to the modern notion of a bar, and the main verse comprises six phrases spread over twelve such bars. In addition, there are two lines marked "Pes", two bars each, that are meant to be sung together repeatedly underneath the main verse. These instructions are included (in Latin) in the manuscript itself:

"Sumer is icumen in" in modern notation:

Lyrics

The celebration of summer in "Sumer is icumen in" is similar to that of spring in the French poetic genre known as the reverdie (lit. "re-greening"). However, there are reasons to doubt such a straightforward and naïve interpretation. The language used lacks all of the conventional springtime-renewal words of a reverdie (such as "green", "new", "begin", or "wax") except for springþ, and elements of the text, especially the cuckoo and the farmyard noises, potentially possess double meanings. "It is the wrong bird, the wrong season, and the wrong language for a reverdie, unless an ironic meaning is intended".

"Bucke Uerteþ"
The translation of "bucke uerteþ" is uncertain. Platzer, on the other hand, views the latter, more vulgar, gloss as informed by "prejudices against mediæval culture" and suspects that those preferring it "may have had an axe to grind".

Erickson derided "linguistic Galahads" for promoting more decent translations, suggesting:

Editorial prudishness has kept that fine little Middle English poem, the Cuckoo Song, out of many a school-book, all because the old poet was familiar with English barn-yards and meadows and in his poem recalled those sights and sounds. He knew that bullocks and bucks feel so good in the springtime that they can hardly contain themselves, and he set down what he saw and heard, leaving it to squeamish editors to distort one of his innocent folk-words into a meaning that he would not recognise. One suspects that scholarly ingenuity has been overworked [...] to save the children of England from indecency.

Similarly, Arthur K. Moore states:

The older anthologists sometimes made ludicrous attempts to gloss 'buck uerteth' in a way tolerable to Victorian sensibilities. Most recent editors have recognized what every farm boy knows—that quadrupeds disport themselves in the spring precisely as the poet has said. To the fourteenth century, the idea was probably inoffensive.

According to Platzer, "this traditional reading is not as secure as the number of editors that have championed it might imply". The evolution of verteþ could not have originated in the unattested Old English feortan, in part because there is a gap of between 100 and 120 years between the first unambiguous usage of that word and its postulated use in Sumer is icumen in. Given that the poem was likely composed in Reading, with Leominster as a second possibility, a quantitative analysis was performed using the Linguistic Atlas of Late Mediæval English; out of nine lexemes originally beginning with the letter F, six demonstrably retained that letter in Reading (the other three were unattested), while four retained it in Leominster (four unattested, with fetch evolving into vetch). The Middle English Dictionary records a personal name Walterus Fartere from the calendar of the close rolls of 1234, and another name Johannes le Fartere from the Leicestershire lay subsidy rolls of 1327. This also implies the existence of a word farten or ferten in Middle English, both with an initial letter F.

Christian version in Latin
Beneath the Middle English lyrics in the manuscript, there is also a set of Latin lyrics which consider the sacrifice of the Crucifixion of Jesus:

†written "" in the manuscript (see Christogram).

Renditions and recordings

A boys' choir sings the rota at the climax of Benjamin Britten's Spring Symphony (Opus 44, first performed 1949).
The opening ceremony of the 1972 Summer Olympics in Munich included a performance of this rota. Children danced to the music around the track of the stadium.

Studio albums
The English Singers made the first studio recording in New York, c. 1927, released on a 10-inch 78rpm disc, Roycroft Living Tone Record No.159, in early 1928.
A second recording, made by the Winchester Music Club, followed in 1929. Released on Columbia (England) D40119 (matrix number WAX4245-2), this twelve-inch 78rpm record was made to illustrate the second in a series of five lectures by Sir George Dyson, for the International Educational Society, and is titled Lecture 61. The Progress Of Music. No. 1 Rota (Canon): Summer Is A Coming In (Part 4).)
 For similar purposes, E. H. Fellowes conducted the St. George's Singers in a recording issued c. 1930 on Columbia (US) 5715, a ten-inch 78rpm disc, part of the eight-disc album M-221, the Columbia History of Music by Ear and Eye, Volume One, Period 1: To the Opening of the Seventeenth Century.
The London Madrigal Group, conducted by T.B. Lawrence, recorded the work on 10 January 1936. This recording was issued later that year on Victrola 4316 (matrix numbers OEA2911 and OEA2913), a ten-inch 78rpm disc.
Cardiacs side project Mr and Mrs Smith and Mr Drake recorded an arrangement of the song on their self-titled album in 1984.
Richard Thompson's own arrangement is the earliest song on his album 1000 Years of Popular Music (2003 Beeswing Records).
 Emilia Dalby and the Sarum Voices covered the song for the album Emilia (2009 Signum Classics).
Post-punk band The Futureheads perform the song a cappella for their album Rant (2012 Nul Records).
The Hilliard Ensemble's album Sumer is icumen in (2002 Harmonia Mundi) opens with this song.

Film
In the 1938 film The Adventures of Robin Hood, Little John (Alan Hale Sr.) is whistling the melody of the song just before he first meets Robin Hood played by Errol Flynn. According to Lisa Colton, "Although it appears only this once, in that fleeting moment the tune serves to introduce the character through performance: the melody was presumably sufficiently recognisable to be representative of medieval English music, but perhaps, more importantly, the fact that Little John is whistling the song emphasizes his peasant status...In Robin Hood, Little John's performance of 'Sumer is icumen in' locates him socially as a contented, lower class male, a symbol of the romanticized ideal of the medieval peasant".

The rendition sung at the climax of the 1973 British film The Wicker Man is a mixed translation by Anthony Shaffer:
Sumer is Icumen in,
Loudly sing, cuckoo!
Grows the seed and blows the mead,
And springs the wood anew;
Sing, cuckoo!
Ewe bleats harshly after lamb,
Cows after calves make moo;
Bullock stamps and deer champs,
Now shrilly sing, cuckoo!
Cuckoo, cuckoo
Wild bird are you;
Be never still, cuckoo!

Television 

In the children's television programme Bagpuss, the mice sing a song called "The Mouse Organ Song: We Will Fix It", to a tune adapted from "Sumer is icumen in".

Parodies
This piece was parodied as "Ancient Music" by the American poet Ezra Pound (Lustra, 1916):

Winter is icumen in,
Lhude sing Goddamm,
Raineth drop and staineth slop,
And how the wind doth ramm!
Sing: Goddamm.
Skiddeth bus and sloppeth us,
An ague hath my ham.
Freezeth river, turneth liver,
Damm you; Sing: Goddamm.
Goddamm, Goddamm, 'tis why I am, Goddamm,
So 'gainst the winter's balm.
Sing goddamm, damm, sing goddamm,
Sing goddamm, sing goddamm, DAMM.

The song is also parodied by "P. D. Q. Bach" (Peter Schickele) as "Summer is a cumin seed" for the penultimate movement of his Grand Oratorio The Seasonings.

The song is also referenced in "Carpe Diem" by The Fugs on their 1965 debut album, The Fugs First Album.

Carpe diem,
Sing, cuckoo sing,
Death is a-comin in,
Sing, cuckoo sing.
death is a-comin in.

Another parody is Plumber is icumen in by A. Y. Campbell:
Plumber is icumen in;
Bludie big tu-du.
Bloweth lampe, and showeth dampe,
And dripth the wud thru.
Bludie hel, boo-hoo!

Thaweth drain, and runneth bath;
Saw saweth, and scrueth scru;
Bull-kuk squirteth, leake spurteth;
Wurry springeth up anew,
Boo-hoo, boo-hoo.

Tom Pugh, Tom Pugh, well plumbes thu, Tom Pugh;
Better job I naver nu.
Therefore will I cease boo-hoo,
Woorie not, but cry pooh-pooh,
Murie sing pooh-pooh, pooh-pooh,
Pooh-pooh!

Notes and references
Notes

References

Sources

Further reading

 Bukofzer, Manfred F. (1944) "'Sumer is icumen in': A Revision". University of California Publications in Music 2: 79–114.
 Colton, Lisa (2014). "Sumer is icumen in". Grove Music Online (1 July, revision) (accessed 26 November 2014)
 Duffin, Ross W. (1988) "The Sumer Canon: A New Revision". Speculum 63:1–21.
 Falck, Robert. (1972). "Rondellus, Canon, and Related Types before 1300". Journal of the American Musicological Society 25, no. 1 (Spring): 38–57.
 Fischer, Andreas (1994). "'Sumer is icumen in': The Seasons of the Year in Middle English and Early Modern English". In Studies in Early Modern English, edited by Dieter Kastovsky, 79–95. Berlin and New York: Mouton De Gruyter. .
 Greentree, Rosemary (2001). The Middle English Lyric and Short Poem. Annotated Bibliographies of Old and Middle English Literature 7. Cambridge: D. S. Brewer. .
 Sanders, Ernest H. (2001). "Sumer is icumen in". Grove Music Online (20 January, bibliography updated 28 August 2002) (accessed 26 November 2014).
 Schofield, B. (1948). "The Provenance and Date of 'Sumer is icumen in'". The Music Review 9:81–86.
 Taylor, Andrew, and A. E. Coates (1998). "The Dates of the Reading Calendar and the Summer Canon". Notes and Queries 243:22–24.
 Toguchi, Kōsaku. (1978). "'Sumer is icumen in' et la caccia: Autour du problème des relations entre le 'Summer canon' et la caccia arsnovistique du trecento". In La musica al tempo del Boccaccio e i suoi rapporti con la letteratura, edited by Agostino Ziino, 435–446. L'ars nova italiana del Trecento 4. Certaldo: Centro di Studi sull'Ars Nova Italiana del Trecento.

External links

Original and translation
Music sheet
Music, text, audio and translation

Analysis of the music, in French

Middle English poems
Rounds (music)
Harleian Collection
Works of uncertain authorship
Medieval compositions